Thaumalea verralli is a species of fly in the family Thaumaleidae. It is found in the  Palearctic .

References

External links
 Images representing Thaumalea verralli at BOLD

Thaumaleidae
Insects described in 1929
Nematoceran flies of Europe